Oakcrest School is an independent liberal arts school for girls grades 6–12 located in Vienna, Virginia. It is guided by the teachings of the Catholic Church and the spirituality of Opus Dei.

History 
In the autumn of 1976, the founding families and educators of Oakcrest started a new all-girls, independent school in a large house on Idaho Avenue in Northwest Washington, D.C. intended to educate young women. The original school had 22 students and six teachers.

In its second year, Oakcrest moved to a former French international school on Yuma Street in Washington, D.C.

Over the next 23 years, Oakcrest established its programs in the D.C., Maryland, and Virginia areas, as well as attracting students from Africa, Asia, Europe, and Latin America. 

In 2000, the school moved to the former McLean Bible Church in Northern Virginia. With this move, Oakcrest added a sixth grade class and expanded its athletics, fine arts, and co-curricular programs.  

In the fall of 2017, Oakcrest opened the doors to its permanent home at 1619 Crowell Road, Vienna, Virginia. Designed in the tradition of a Virginia manor house, the campus is set on 23 acres and features home athletic fields.

Accreditation 
Oakcrest is accredited by the Southern Association of Colleges and Schools, Council on Accreditation and School Improvement and the Middle States Association Commissions on Elementary and Secondary Schools (MSA-CSS). Oakcrest is a member of the Virginia Council for Private Education (VCPE) and the National Catholic Education Association (NCEA).

Academics 
Oakcrest offers a liberal arts curriculum spanning the arts, the humanities, mathematics, science, and technology.

The school has a 6:1 student teacher ratio, with an average class size of 15; 83% of faculty hold advanced degrees or postgraduate certificates. Oakcrest offers 16 Advanced Placement Courses and is home to five academic honor societies. 

To graduate, all students complete four years each of Upper School-level English, Mathematics, Science, and History and three years of a single foreign language. Students are also required to take Music and Arts Appreciation, Logic and Rhetoric, three years of Theology, one year of Philosophy and four semesters of Physical Education.

All seniors research, write, and defend a thesis paper.

Athletics 
85% of Oakcrest students participate in athletics.  Oakcrest has an all-female coaching staff and offers 10 different sports.  Oakcrest is a member of the Virginia Christian Athletic Conference (VCAC) and also swims competitively in the Washington Metro Prep School Swim & Dive League (WMPSSDL). Before joining VCAC, Oakcrest was a member of the Potomac Valley Athletic Conference (PVAC) for 30 years.

Campus facilities 
Oakcrest's 23-acre property includes a three-story main building with a chapel; two academic wings with teaching and advising spaces; classrooms, science labs, art and music rooms; a lobby; a dining/multipurpose room; a library; soccer, lacrosse and softball fields and outdoor grounds. Construction of an athletic center, which will extend from the east academic wing, began in March of 2022, and will be completed in the spring of 2023.  The two-story athletic center will add a gymnasium, fitness center, and five classrooms to the campus.

References

External links 
 Oakcrest School website

Catholic secondary schools in Virginia
Vienna, Virginia
Educational institutions established in 1976
Girls' schools in Virginia
Schools in Fairfax County, Virginia
Opus Dei schools
1976 establishments in Virginia
Roman Catholic Diocese of Arlington